The Men's giant slalom competition at the FIS Alpine World Ski Championships 2023 was held at L'Éclipse ski course in Courchevel on 16 and 17 February 2023.

Results

Final
The final was started on 17 February at 10:00 and 13:30.

Qualification
The qualification was held on 16 February at 10:00 and 13:30.

References

Men's giant slalom